Eberhard was Archbishop of Salzburg, Austria. 

Eberhard was born to a noble family of Nuremberg, Germany; he became a Benedictine in 1125 at Pruffening, Germany. Later he was made Abbot of Biburg near Regensburg. In 1146 Pope Innocent II appointed him Archbishop of Salzburg.

He rose to fame as a mediator when Pope Alexander III was faced with the “Investiture Controversy”, led by Holy Roman Emperor Frederick I Barbarossa and antipope Victor IV. Eberhard was one of the most able and most holy of the prelates of his age. He died in 1164, at the age of seventy-nine, returning from another peace keeping mission.

Notes 

12th-century German Roman Catholic bishops
Roman Catholic archbishops of Salzburg
12th-century Roman Catholic archbishops in the Holy Roman Empire
Austrian Benedictines
Austrian Roman Catholic saints
12th-century Christian saints
Austrian people of German descent
Clergy from Nuremberg
1164 deaths
Year of birth unknown

Eberhard II (1240), archbishop of Salzburg, affirmed that the Pope was the antichrist.
“Stated at a synod of bishops held at Regensburg in 1240 that the people of his day were “accustomed” to calling the pope antichrist.” (LeRoy Edwin Froom, The Prophetic Faith of our Fathers)